Database auditing involves observing a database so as to be aware of the actions of database users. Database administrators and consultants often set up auditing for security purposes, for example, to ensure that those without the permission to access information do not access it.

References

Further reading
Gallegos, F.  C. Gonzales, D. Manson, and S. Senft.  Information Technology
Control and Audit.  Second Edition.  Boca Raton, Florida:  CRC Press LLC, 2000.
Ron Ben-Natan, IBM Gold Consultant and Guardium CTO. Implementing Database Security and Auditing. Digital Press, 2005.
KK Mookhey (2005). IT Audit.  Vol. 8.  Auditing MS SQL Server Security.
IT Audit.  Vol. 8  Murray Mazer.  Database Auditing-Essential Business Practice for Today’s Risk Management May 19, 2005.

Audit
Types of auditing
Computer access control